Gogiashvili is a Georgian surname. Notable people with the surname include:

 Anton Gogiashvili (1878–1907), Georgian painter and engraver.
 Giorgi Gogiashvili (born 1971), retired Georgian professional footballer. 
 Guram Gogiashvili (born 1934),  Georgian writer, translator and editor.
 Jemal Gogiashvili (born 1988), Georgian professional footballer.

References

Surnames of Georgian origin
Georgian-language surnames